Aquatics at the 1975 Southeast Asian Peninsular Games included swimming, diving and water polo events. The three sports of aquatics were held in Bangkok, Thailand. Aquatics events were held between 11 December to 14 December.

Medal winners

Swimming
Men's events

Women's events

Diving

Water polo

References

Southeast Asian Peninsular Games
Events at the 1975 Southeast Asian Peninsular Games
1975